Gavrud Rural District is a rural district (dehestan) in Muchesh District, Kamyaran County, Kurdistan Province, Iran. At the 2006 census, its population was 11,304, in 2,659 families. The rural district has 15 villages.

References 

Rural Districts of Kurdistan Province
Kamyaran County